Chief Petty Officer First Class Michel Vigneault was a Royal Canadian Navy sailor, who served as the Royal Canadian Navy Command Chief Petty Officer, the most senior enlisted position in the Navy.

Naval career
Vigneault joined the Navy at 17 years old in 1984 as a signalman.
In July 1985, he joined his first ship, Her Majesty's Canadian Ship (HMCS) HMCS Huron (DDG 281) , and subsequently served in HMCS Protecteur (AOR 509),  HMCS Algonquin (DDG 283), HMCS Gatineau (DDE 236), HMCS Fredericton (FFH 337), HMCS Nipigon (DDH 266), HMCS Montréal (FFH 336) and HMCS St. John's (FFH 340), and at several shore establishments. Promoted to his current rank in 2009, CPO1 Vigneault was posted to Ottawa as the Career Manager for the naval communicators occupation. In 2010 he studied for a year at the Royal Military College of Canada as part of the Knowledge Acquisition Program, on completion of which he was appointed Coxswain of HMCS Montréal (FFH 336) in June 2011. In July 2013, Vigneault was appointed as Chief Petty Officer for the Pacific Fleet. He served as Pacific Fleet Chief Petty Officer until July 2016.

In August 2016, CPO1 Vigneault was appointed Royal Canadian Navy Command Chief Petty Officer. .

CPO1 Vigneault retired from the RCN after 34 years of dedicated service. In a formal change of command ceremony, on June 12, 2019, presided by Vadm Ron Lloyd (Former Commander of the Royal Canadian Navy), CPO1 Vigneault stepped down from the Command Chief position, and CPO1 David Steeves assumed his duties. CPO1 Steeves most recently served as Formation Chief for Maritime Forces Pacific. The ceremony was held at Her Majesty's Canadian Dockyard  Halifax, home of Maritime Forces Atlantic.

Awards and decorations
Vigneault's personal awards and decorations include the following:

References

Royal Canadian Navy personnel
Members of the Order of Military Merit (Canada)
Living people
1967 births